The Iriga City Oragons is a professional women's volleyball club that played in the Philippine SuperLiga. The team is owned by the Local Government of Iriga City.

In 2018, the Lady Oragons returned to the Premier Volleyball League during the reinforced conference and is joined by the Philippine Navy players. The team's last participation in the defunct Shakey's V-League was back in the 2016 open conference.

Current roster
For the 2018 Premier Volleyball League Open Conference:
Philippine Navy – Iriga City

Head coach
  Edgardo Rusit
Assistant coaches
  Leah Ariola
  Cecile Cruzada
| valign="top" |

Team manager
  Madelaine Alfelor–Gazmen
Physical Therapist
  Alnasri Asiri

Previous roster

Philippine Navy – Iriga City

Head coach
  Edgardo Rusit
Assistant coaches
  Leah Ariola
  Cecile Cruzada
| valign="top" |

Team manager
  Madelaine Alfelor–Gazmen
Physical Therapist
  Alnasri Asiri

Philippine Navy – Iriga City

Head coach
  Edgardo Rusit
Assistant coaches
  Leah Ariola
  Cecile Cruzada
| valign="top" |

Team manager
  Madelaine Alfelor–Gazmen
Physical Therapist
  Alnasri Asiri

Iriga City Lady Oragons 

Head coach
  Parley Tupaz
Assistant Coach(es)
  Romeo Alaba
  Manuel Cabrera
| valign="top" |

Team manager
  Madelaine Alfelor
Physical Therapist
   Nagrampa 

 Team Captain
 Import
 Draft Pick
 Rookie
 Inactive
 Suspended
 Free Agent
 Injured

Honors

Team 
Premier Volleyball League

Philippine SuperLiga

Individual

Team captains 
 Reynelen Raterta (2017)
  Grazielle Bombita (2018)

Coaches 
 Parley Tupas (2017)
 Edgardo Rusit (2018)

Imports 
Premier Volleyball League

Philippine Super Liga

See also 
Philippine Navy Fighting Stingrays
Philippine SuperLiga

References 

Women's volleyball teams in the Philippines
Philippine Super Liga
2017 establishments in the Philippines
Volleyball clubs established in 2017